Dušan Hodžić (born 31 October 1993) is a Serbian professional footballer who plays as a right-back for Radnik Surdulica.

Club career
He left Sarajevo in June 2021.

On 19 August 2021, he signed with Radnik Surdulica.

Career statistics

Club

Honours
Mladost Velika Obarska
First League of RS: 2012–13

Radnik Bijeljina
Bosnian Cup: 2015–16

Sarajevo
Bosnian Premier League: 2019–20
Bosnian Cup: 2020–21

References

External links
Dušan Hodžić at Sofascore

1993 births
Living people
People from Majdanpek
Bosniaks of Serbia
Association football fullbacks
Serbian footballers
FK Mladost Velika Obarska players
FK Velež Mostar players
FK Radnik Bijeljina players
FK Sarajevo players
NK Čelik Zenica players
FK Radnik Surdulica players
Premier League of Bosnia and Herzegovina players
Serbian SuperLiga players